Parker High School Auditorium is a historic high school auditorium located at Greenville, South Carolina. It was built in 1938 with funding provided by the Works Progress Administration.  It is a Classical Revival style 7500 square foot rectangular brick building with a front gabled roof.  It is the last remaining building from the largest WPA school project in South Carolina.

It was added to the National Register of Historic Places in 1996.

References

Works Progress Administration in South Carolina
School buildings on the National Register of Historic Places in South Carolina
Neoclassical architecture in South Carolina
School buildings completed in 1938
National Register of Historic Places in Greenville, South Carolina